Reinman is a surname. Notable people with the surname include:

Paul Reinman (1910–1988), American comic book artist
Yosef Reinman, American Orthodox rabbi, writer, historian, and scholar

See also
Reinmann
Reinmar
Reitman